Venusian Lullaby is an original novel written by Paul Leonard and based on the long-running British science fiction television series Doctor Who. It features the First Doctor, Ian and Barbara.

Synopsis
When the Doctor, Ian and Barbara arrive on Venus, they find an ancient civilization on the edge of extinction. Conflict brews between those who accept oblivion and those desperate for salvation. Then a space-traveling race arrives, offering to rescue the Venusians by transporting them to Earth, three billion years before man is due to evolve. But are the visitors' motivations that simple, and can the Doctor allow the sacrifice of humanity's future to save another species?

Trivia
The title refers to a favourite tune of the Third Doctor's, the "Venusian" words of which were first heard in The Dæmons, where the first line is said to mean "Close your eyes, my darling, (well, three of them at least)". The rough transliteration of the song follows ("h" in "haroon" is silent):

Klokleda partha menin klatch,
haroon haroon haroon,
Klokleda sheenah tierra natch,
haroon haroon haroon,
Haroon haroon haroon...

The words were put to music and sung by Jon Pertwee in both The Curse of Peladon and The Monster of Peladon, in actuality the tune of the Christmas carol "God Rest Ye Merry Gentlemen".

Sequel
By the Time I Get to Venus, or Recuerda by Blair Bidmead, a novella featuring the pulp character Señor 105 visiting the ancient Venus of Venusian Lullaby, was published in e-book form by Manleigh Books in 2012. The e-book's use of the novel's continuity was licensed by Paul Leonard.

References

External links
The Cloister Library - Venusian Lullaby

1994 British novels
1994 science fiction novels
Virgin Missing Adventures
First Doctor novels
British science fiction novels
Novels set on Venus
Novels by Paul Leonard